Şehnaz Dilan (born Şehnaz Vreskala on August 27, 1960) is a Turkish former women's footballer, model, film and TV actress and singer.

Private life
Şehna Dilan was born as Şehnaz Vreskala to an Albanian immigrant family from former Yugoslavia in Izmir, Turkey on August 27, 1960.

In 2000, she gave birth to a daughter.

Career

Footballer
Inspired by her uncle, who was the regional director in Izmir for football, Dilan began football playing in 1979. She was a member of Filizspor in her hometown. She became the captain of her team, and enjoyed championship title in 1981. Her football career lasted until the end of 1983 when her mother died. She did football training four hours a day. During this time, she performed also other sports like swimming, volleyball and took part at cycling races, but she liked football most.

Model
After her mother's death, she went to Istanbul, where she was raised by her aunt. She began to appear in advertising and runway shows. As she was a former football player, she had a muscular body, which was effective for the selection of her as a mannequin. Dilan also posed for erotic photography in popular Turkish men's magazines like Erkekçe, Peri and Bravo in the 1980s.

Actress
She entered cinema for a role in the move Kızlar Sınıfı ("Girls' Class").  She left modelling and made five more films with İlyas Salman. Her family was against her acting in movies. However, she was very enthusiastic, and she divorced her husband to continue with the job of acting in films. Dilan starred with Şener Şen in the movie Âşık Oldum ("I Fell in Love") (1985) by Ertem Eğilmez, an adaptation of Woman in Red. Her next film, she played a leading role in, was with Kemal Sunal in Yoksul ("The Poor") (1986) by Zeki Ökten. Then, she appeared in the movie Gömlek’ ("The Shirt") by Bilge Olgaç. For her role in Eskici ve Oğulları ("The Used-good Dealer and His Sons") by Şahin Gök, she was honored. Dilan left the film set of addam’ın Askerleri ("The Soldiers of Saddam") by Gani Rüzgar Şavata and gave up because she could not stand the killing of a horse. She returned to the cinema with a role in Yağmurlu Gecede Gülperi by Oğuz Gözen.

Singer
After her divorce, she played in the television serials with the singers İbrahim Tatlıses, Oya Aydoğan and Müslüm Gürses in 1993. She  appeared as a singer on the stage in a night club. Later, she worked as a soloist in luxury hotels.

Filmography

References

External links
 

Living people
1960 births
Sportspeople from İzmir
Musicians from İzmir
Actresses from İzmir
Turkish people of Macedonian descent
Turkish women's footballers
Turkish female models
Turkish film actresses
Turkish television actresses
20th-century Turkish actresses
21st-century Turkish actresses
Turkish women singers
Women's association footballers not categorized by position